Secunderabad railway division is one of the six divisions of South Central Railway zone (SCR) of the Indian Railways. It is one of the top five divisions of Indian Railways and its divisional and zonal headquarters are at Secunderabad.

History 

Secunderabad division was formed on 2 October 1966. It had broad gauge and meter gauge, later, meter gauge was a part of Hyderabad division.

Routes 

It covers the states of Telangana, Andhra Pradesh,  Karnataka and Maharashtra. 

The following are the sections under the division.

Economy

The division contributes 64% of freight and over 35% of passenger traffic to South Central Railway. The division has 22,178 employees.

See also
 Divisions of Indian Railways

References

 
Divisions of Indian Railways
Transport in Secunderabad